Dewayne Hendrix (born June 13, 1995) is a professional gridiron football defensive end for the Toronto Argonauts of the Canadian Football League (CFL). He played college football for the Pittsburgh Panthers.

Early years
Hendrix attended O'Fallon Township High School. In his senior season, he had 60 tackles and was named a Semper Fidelis All-American. A four-star recruit, Hendrix was rated as the No. 5 strongside defensive end, the No. 3 player in Illinois, and the No. 78 overall recruit by Rivals.com. He received 22 scholarship offers, including Michigan State, Illinois and seven other Big Ten schools but committed to Tennessee.

College career
Hendrix played seven games as a true freshman at Tennessee and had two tackles. In December, he announced he was transferring from the program in search of a "better opportunity." He decided to transfer to Pittsburgh on April 27, 2015, turning down offers from Illinois, Iowa State and Northern Illinois.

He lost his sophomore season to injury after hurting his foot in the Week 1 game against Villanova. In 2017, Hendrix played in 11 games and had 21 tackles including five for a loss. As a senior in 2018, he recorded 29 tackles including five for a loss and had 4.5 sacks. In his career at Pittsburgh, Hendrix played in 25 games and made 50 tackles, including 10 for a loss, 7.5 sacks and two fumble recoveries.

Professional career
After going undrafted in the 2019 NFL draft, Hendrix was signed by the Miami Dolphins on April 29. He participated in the preseason, and had two sacks against the Atlanta Falcons and one sack versus the New Orleans Saints. He was waived on August 31. Hendrix was subsequently signed to the Dolphins' practice squad, but was waived on October 7.

On November 19, the Chicago Bears signed Hendrix to their practice squad. He was waived by the Bears on December 9. On December 18, Hendrix was signed by the Jacksonville Jaguars to their practice squad.

Hendrix joined the St. Louis BattleHawks of the XFL. In five games with the BattleHawks, Hendrix had four tackles, one sack and a quarterback hurry. He had his contract terminated when the league suspended operations on April 10, 2020. On March 30, 2020, Hendrix signed with the Pittsburgh Steelers. He was waived on August 2, 2020.

Hendrix had a tryout with the Cleveland Browns on August 19, 2020. He signed with the Alphas of The Spring League for the 2020 Fall season.

On February 12, 2021, Hendrix signed with the Toronto Argonauts of the Canadian Football League.

References

External links
Toronto Argonauts bio
 Pittsburgh Panthers bio

1995 births
Living people
American football defensive ends
Players of American football from Illinois
People from St. Clair County, Illinois
Pittsburgh Panthers football players
Tennessee Volunteers football players
St. Louis BattleHawks players
Pittsburgh Steelers players
The Spring League players
Toronto Argonauts players